Loyalists were colonists in the Thirteen Colonies who remained loyal to the British Crown during the American Revolutionary War, often referred to as Tories, Royalists or King's Men at the time. They were opposed by the Patriots, who supported the revolution, and called them "persons inimical to the liberties of America." 

Prominent Loyalists repeatedly assured the British government that many thousands of them would spring to arms and fight for the crown. The British government acted in expectation of that, especially in the southern campaigns in 1780–81. Britain was able to effectively protect the people only in areas where they had military control, and in return, the number of military Loyalists was significantly lower than what had been expected. Due to the conflicting political views, loyalists were often under suspicion of those in the British military, who did not know whom they could fully trust in such a conflicted situation; they were often looked down upon.

Patriots watched suspected Loyalists very closely and would not tolerate any organized Loyalist opposition. Many outspoken or militarily active Loyalists were forced to flee, especially to their stronghold of New York City. William Franklin, the royal governor of New Jersey and son of Patriot leader Benjamin Franklin, became the leader of the Loyalists after his release from a Patriot prison in 1778. He worked to build Loyalist military units to fight in the war. Woodrow Wilson wrote that "there had been no less than twenty-five thousand loyalists enlisted in the British service during the five years of the fighting. At one time (1779) they had actually outnumbered the whole of the continental muster under the personal command of Washington."

When their cause was defeated, about 15 percent of the Loyalists (65,000–70,000 people) fled to other parts of the British Empire; especially to Britain itself, or to British North America (now Canada). The southern Loyalists moved mostly to Florida, which had remained loyal to the Crown, and to British Caribbean possessions. Northern Loyalists largely migrated to Ontario, Quebec, New Brunswick, and Nova Scotia. They called themselves United Empire Loyalists. Most were compensated with Canadian land or British cash distributed through formal claims procedures. Loyalists who left the US received over £3 million or about 37% of their losses from the British government. Loyalists who stayed in the US were generally able to retain their property and become American citizens. Many Loyalists eventually returned to the US after the war and discriminatory laws had been repealed. Historians have estimated that between 15% and 20% (300,000 to 400,000) of the 2,000,000 whites in the colonies in 1775 were Loyalists.

Background
Families were often divided during the American Revolution, and many felt themselves to be both American and British, still owing a loyalty to the mother country. Maryland lawyer Daniel Dulaney the Younger opposed taxation without representation but would not break his oath to the King or take up arms against him. He wrote: "There may be a time when redress may not be obtained. Till then, I shall recommend a legal, orderly, and prudent resentment". Most Americans hoped for a peaceful reconciliation but were forced to choose sides by the Patriots who took control nearly everywhere in the Thirteen Colonies in 1775–76.

Motives for Loyalism
Yale historian Leonard Woods Larabee has identified eight characteristics of the Loyalists that made them essentially conservative and loyal to the King and to Britain:
 They were older, better established, and resisted radical change.
 They felt that rebellion against the Crown – the legitimate government – was morally wrong. They saw themselves as Americans but loyal to the British Empire and saw a rebellion against Great Britain as a betrayal to the Empire. At the time the national identity of Americans was still in formation and the very idea of two separate peoples (nationalities) with their own sovereign states (the Kingdom of Great Britain and the United States of America) was itself revolutionary.
 They felt alienated when the Patriots (seen by them as separatists who rebelled against the Crown) resorted to violence, such as burning down houses and tarring and feathering.
 They wanted to take a middle-of-the-road position and were not pleased when forced by Patriots to declare their opposition.
 They had business and family links with Britain.
 They felt that independence from Britain would come eventually, but wanted it to come about organically.
 They were wary that chaos, corruption, and mob rule would come about as a result of revolution.
 Some were “pessimists” who did not display the same belief in the future that the Patriots did. Others recalled the dreadful experiences of many Jacobite rebels after the failure of the last Jacobite rebellion as recently as 1745 who often lost their lands when the Hanoverian government won.

Other motives of the Loyalists included:
 They felt a need for order and believed that Parliament was the legitimate authority.
 In New York, powerful families had assembled colony-wide coalitions of supporters; men long associated with the French Huguenot/Dutch De Lancey faction went along when its leadership decided to support the crown.
 They felt themselves to be weak or threatened within American society and in need of an outside defender such as the British Crown and Parliament.
 Black loyalists were promised freedom from slavery by the British.
 They felt that being a part of the British Empire was crucial in terms of commerce and their business operations.

Loyalism and military operations

In the opening months of the Revolutionary War, the Patriots laid siege to Boston, where most of the British forces were stationed. Elsewhere there were few British troops and the Patriots seized control of all levels of government, as well as supplies of arms and gunpowder. Vocal Loyalists recruited people to their side, often with the encouragement and assistance of royal governors. In the South Carolina back country, Loyalist recruitment outstripped that of Patriots. A brief siege at Ninety Six, South Carolina in the fall of 1775 was followed by a rapid rise in Patriot recruiting. In what became known as the Snow Campaign, partisan militia arrested or drove out most of the back country Loyalist leadership. North Carolina back country Scots and former Regulators joined forces in early 1776, but they were broken as a force at the Battle of Moore's Creek Bridge.

By July 4, 1776, the Patriots had gained control of virtually all territory in the Thirteen Colonies and expelled all royal officials. No one who openly proclaimed their loyalty to the Crown was allowed to remain, so Loyalists fled or kept quiet. Some of those who remained later gave aid to invading British armies or joined uniformed Loyalist regiments.

The British were forced out of Boston by March 17, 1776. They regrouped at Halifax and attacked New York in August, defeating George Washington's army at Long Island and capturing New York City and its vicinity, and they occupied the mouth of the Hudson River until 1783. British forces seized control of other cities, including Philadelphia (1777), Savannah, Georgia (1778–83), and Charleston, South Carolina (1780–82). But 90% of the colonial population lived outside the cities, with the effective result that Congress represented 80 to 90 percent of the population. The British removed their governors from colonies where the Patriots were in control, but Loyalist civilian government was re-established in coastal Georgia from 1779 to 1782, despite the presence of Patriot forces in the northern part of Georgia. Essentially, the British were only able to maintain power in areas where they had a strong military presence.

Numbers of Loyalists
Historian Robert Calhoon wrote in 2000, concerning the proportion of Loyalists to Patriots in the Thirteen Colonies:

Before Calhoon's work, estimates of the Loyalist share of the population were somewhat higher, at about one-third, but these estimates are now rejected as too high by most scholars. In 1968 historian Paul H. Smith estimated there were about 400,000 Loyalists, or 16% of the white population of 2.25 million in 1780.

Historian Robert Middlekauff summarized scholarly research on the nature of Loyalist support as follows:

The largest number of loyalists were found in the middle colonies: many tenant farmers of New York supported the king, for example, as did many of the Dutch in the colony and in New Jersey. The Germans in Pennsylvania tried to stay out of the Revolution, just as many Quakers did, and when that failed, clung to the familiar connection rather than embrace the new. Highland Scots in the Carolinas, a fair number of Anglican clergy and their parishioners in Connecticut and New York, a few Presbyterians in the southern colonies, and a large number of the Iroquois stayed loyal to the king.

After the British military capture of New York City and Long Island it became the British military and political base of operations in North America from 1776 to 1783, prompting revolutionaries to flee and resulting in a large concentration of Loyalists, many of whom were refugees from other states.

According to Calhoon, Loyalists tended to be older and wealthier, but there were also many Loyalists of humble means. Many active Church of England members became Loyalists. Some recent arrivals from Britain, especially those from Scotland, had a high Loyalist proportion. Loyalists in the southern colonies were suppressed by the local Patriots, who controlled local and state government. Many people—including former Regulators in North Carolina — refused to join the rebellion, as they had earlier protested against corruption by local authorities who later became Revolutionary leaders. The oppression by the local Whigs during the Regulation led to many of the residents of backcountry North Carolina sitting out the Revolution or siding with the Loyalists.

In areas under Patriot control, Loyalists were subject to confiscation of property, and outspoken supporters of the king were threatened with public humiliation such as tarring and feathering, or physical attack. It is not known how many Loyalist civilians were harassed by the Patriots, but the treatment was a warning to other Loyalists not to take up arms. In September 1775, William Drayton and Loyalist leader Colonel Thomas Fletchall signed a treaty of neutrality in the interior community of Ninety Six, South Carolina. For actively aiding the British army when it occupied Philadelphia, two residents of the city were tried for treason, convicted, and executed by returning Patriot forces.

Slavery and Black Loyalists

As a result of the looming crisis in 1775, the Royal Governor of Virginia, Lord Dunmore, issued a proclamation that promised freedom to indentured servants and slaves who were able to bear arms and join his Loyalist Ethiopian Regiment. Many of the slaves in the South joined the Loyalists with intentions of gaining freedom and escaping the South. About 800 did so; some helped rout the Virginia militia at the Battle of Kemp's Landing and fought in the Battle of Great Bridge on the Elizabeth River, wearing the motto "Liberty to Slaves", but this time they were defeated. The remains of their regiment were then involved in the evacuation of Norfolk, after which they served in the Chesapeake area. Eventually the camp that they had set up there suffered an outbreak of smallpox and other diseases. This took a heavy toll, putting many of them out of action for some time. The survivors joined other Loyalist units and continued to serve throughout the war. African-Americans were often the first to come forward to volunteer and a total of 12,000 African Americans served with the British from 1775 to 1783. This forced the Patriots to also offer freedom to those who would serve in the Continental Army, with thousands of Black Patriots serving in the Continental Army.

Americans who gained their freedom by fighting for the British became known as Black Loyalists. The British honored the pledge of freedom in New York City through the efforts of General Guy Carleton, who recorded the names of African Americans who had supported the British in a document called the Book of Negroes, which granted freedom to slaves who had escaped and assisted the British. About 4,000 Black Loyalists went to the British colonies of Nova Scotia and New Brunswick, where they were promised land grants. They founded communities across the two provinces, many of which still exist today. Over 2,500 settled in Birchtown, Nova Scotia, instantly making it the largest free black community in North America. However, the long period of waiting time to be officially given land grants that were given to them and the prejudices of white Loyalists in nearby Shelburne who regularly harassed the settlement in events such as the Shelburne Riots in 1784, made life very difficult for the community. In 1791 the Sierra Leone Company offered to transport dissatisfied black Loyalists to the nascent colony of Sierra Leone in West Africa, with the promise of better land and more equality. About 1,200 left Nova Scotia for Sierra Leone, where they named the capital Freetown. After 1787 they became Sierra Leone's ruling elite during the colonial era and their descendants, the Sierra Leone Creoles, are the cultural elites of the nation. About 400 to 1,000 free blacks who joined the British side in the Revolution went to London and joined the free black community of about 10,000 there.

Loyalist women 
While men were out fighting for the Crown, women served at home protecting their land and property. At the end of the war, many loyalist men left America for the shelter of England, leaving their wives and daughters to protect their land The main punishment for Loyalist families was the expropriation of property, but married women were protected under "feme covert", which meant that they had no political identity and their legal rights were absorbed by their husbands. This created an awkward dilemma for the confiscation committees: confiscating the land of such a woman would punish her for her husband's actions. In many cases, the women did not get a choice on if they were labeled a loyalist or a patriot; the label was dependent on their husband's political association. However, some women showed their loyalty to the crown by continually purchasing British goods, writing it down, and showing resistance to the Patriots. Grace Growden Galloway recorded the experience in her diary. Her writings show the difficulties that her family faced during the revolution. Galloway's property was seized by the Rebels and she spent the rest of her life fighting to regain it. It was returned to her heirs in 1783, after she and her husband had died. 

Patriot allowed women to become involved in politics in a larger scale than the loyalist. Some women involved in political activity include Catharine Macaulay (a loyalist) and Mercy Otis Warren who were both writers during this time. Both women maintained a 20-year friendship although they wrote about different sides of the war. Macaulay wrote from a loyalist British perspective whereas Warren wrote about her support for the American Revolution. Macaulay's work include History of England and Warren wrote History of the Rise, Progress, and Termination of the American Revolution. Although both women's works were unpopular, during this time, it pushed them to learn from social critique.

Loyalism in Canada and Nova Scotia

Rebel agents were active in Quebec (which was then frequently called "Canada", the name of the earlier French province) in the months leading to the outbreak of active hostilities. John Brown, an agent of the Boston Committee of Correspondence, worked with Canadian merchant Thomas Walker and other rebel sympathisers during the winter of 1774–1775 to convince inhabitants to support the actions of the First Continental Congress. However, many of Quebec's inhabitants remained neutral, resisting service to either the British or the Americans.

Although some Canadians took up arms in support of the rebellion, the majority remained loyal to the King. French Canadians had been satisfied by the British government's Quebec Act of 1774, which offered religious and linguistic toleration; in general, they did not sympathize with a rebellion that they saw as being led by Protestants from New England, who were their commercial rivals and hereditary enemies. Most of the English-speaking settlers had arrived following the British conquest of Canada in 1759–1760, and were unlikely to support separation from Britain. The older British colonies, Newfoundland and Nova Scotia (including what is now New Brunswick) also remained loyal and contributed military forces in support of the Crown.

In late 1775 the Continental Army sent a force into Quebec, led by General Richard Montgomery and Colonel Benedict Arnold, with the goal of convincing the residents of Quebec to join the Revolution. Although only a minority of Canadians openly expressed loyalty to King George, about 1,500 militia fought for the King in the Siege of Fort St. Jean. In the region south of Montreal that was occupied by the Continentals, some inhabitants supported the rebellion and raised two regiments to join the Patriot forces.

In Nova Scotia, there were many Yankee settlers originally from New England, and they generally supported the principles of the revolution. The allegiance toward the rebellion waned as American privateers raided Nova Scotia communities throughout the war. As well, the Nova Scotia government used the law to convict people for sedition and treason for supporting the rebel cause. There was also the influence of an influx of recent immigration from the British isles, and they remained neutral during the war, and the influx was greatest in Halifax. Britain in any case built up powerful forces at the naval base of Halifax after the failure of Jonathan Eddy to capture Fort Cumberland in 1776. Although the Continentals captured Montreal in November 1775, they were turned back a month later at Quebec City by a combination of the British military under Governor Guy Carleton, the difficult terrain and weather, and an indifferent local response. The Continental forces would be driven from Quebec in 1776, after the breakup of ice on the St. Lawrence River and the arrival of British transports in May and June. There would be no further serious attempt to challenge British control of present-day Canada until the War of 1812.

In 1777, 1,500 Loyalist militia took part in the Saratoga campaign in New York, and surrendered with General Burgoyne after the Battles of Saratoga in October. For the rest of the war, Quebec acted as a base for raiding expeditions, conducted primarily by Loyalists and Indians, against frontier communities.

Military service
The Loyalists rarely attempted any political organization. They were often passive unless regular British army units were in the area. The British, however, assumed a highly activist Loyalist community was ready to mobilize and planned much of their strategy around raising Loyalist regiments. The British provincial line, consisting of Americans enlisted on a regular army status, enrolled 19,000 Loyalists (50 units and 312 companies). The maximum strength of the Loyalist provincial line was 9,700 in December 1780. In all about 19,000 at one time or another were soldiers or militia in British forces. Loyalists from South Carolina fought for the British in the Battle of Camden. The British forces at the Battle of Monck's Corner and the Battle of Lenud's Ferry consisted entirely of Loyalists with the exception of the commanding officer (Banastre Tarleton). Both white and black Loyalists fought for the British at the Battle of Kemp's Landing in Virginia.

Emigration from the United States

Estimates for how many Loyalists emigrated after the war differ. Historian Maya Jasanoff calculated 60,000 in total went to British North America, including about 50,000 whites, however Philip Ranlet estimates that only 20,000 adult white Loyalists went to Canada, while Wallace Brown cites about 80,000 Loyalists in total permanently left the United States. 

According to Jasanoff, the majority of these Loyalists – 36,000 – went to New Brunswick and Nova Scotia, while about 6,600 went to Quebec and 2,000 to Prince Edward Island. About 5,090 white Loyalists went to Florida, bringing along their slaves who numbered about 8,285 (421 whites and 2,561 blacks returned to the States from Florida). When Florida was returned to Spain, however, very few Loyalists remained there. Approximately 6,000 whites went to Jamaica and other Caribbean islands, notably the Bahamas, and about 13,000 went to Britain (including 5,000 free blacks). The total is 60–62,000 whites.

A precise figure cannot be known because the records were incomplete and inaccurate, and small numbers continued to leave after 1783. The 50,000 or so white departures represented about 10% of the Loyalists (at 20-25% of the white population). Loyalists (especially soldiers and former officials) could choose evacuation. Loyalists whose roots were not yet deeply embedded in the United States were more likely to leave; older people who had familial bonds and had acquired friends, property, and a degree of social respectability were more likely to remain in the US. The vast majority of the half-million white Loyalists, about 20-25% of the total number of whites, remained in the US. Starting in the mid–1780s a small percentage of those who had left returned to the United States. The exiles amounted to about 2% of the total US population of 3 million at the end of the war in 1783.

After 1783 some former Loyalists, especially Germans from Pennsylvania, emigrated to Canada to take advantage of the British government's offer of free land. Many departed the fledgling United States because they faced continuing hostility. In another migration-motivated mainly by economic rather than political reasons- more than 20,000 and perhaps as many as 30,000 "Late Loyalists" arrived in Ontario in the 1790s attracted by Lieutenant-Governor Simcoe's policy of land and low taxes, one-fifth those in the US and swearing an oath of allegiance to the King.

The 36,000 or so who went to Nova Scotia were not well received by the 17,000 Nova Scotians, who were mostly descendants of New Englanders settled there before the Revolution. "They [the Loyalists]", Colonel Thomas Dundas wrote in 1786, "have experienced every possible injury from the old inhabitants of Nova Scotia, who are even more disaffected towards the British Government than any of the new States ever were. This makes me much doubt their remaining long dependent." In response, the colony of New Brunswick, until 1784 part of Nova Scotia, was created for the 14,000 who had settled in those parts. Of the 46,000 who went to Canada, 10,000 went to Quebec, especially what is now modern-day Ontario, the rest to Nova Scotia and PEI.

Realizing the importance of some type of consideration, on November 9, 1789, Lord Dorchester, the governor of Quebec, declared that it was his wish to "put the mark of Honour upon the Families who had adhered to the Unity of the Empire." As a result of Dorchester's statement, the printed militia rolls carried the notation:

Those Loyalists who have adhered to the Unity of the Empire, and joined the Royal Standard before the Treaty of Separation in the year 1783, and all their Children and their Descendants by either sex, are to be distinguished by the following Capitals, affixed to their names: U.E. Alluding to their great principle The Unity of the Empire.

The post-nominals "U.E." are rarely seen today, but the influence of the Loyalists on the evolution of Canada remains. Their ties to Britain and/or their antipathy to the United States provided the strength needed to keep Canada independent and distinct in North America. The Loyalists' basic distrust of republicanism and "mob rule" influenced Canada's gradual path to independence. The new British North American provinces of Upper Canada (the forerunner of Ontario) and New Brunswick were founded as places of refuge for the United Empire Loyalists.

In an interesting historical twist Peter Matthews, a son of Loyalists, participated in the Upper Canada Rebellion which sought relief from oligarchic British colonial government and pursued American-style Republicanism. He was arrested, tried and executed in Toronto, and later became heralded as a patriot to the movement which led to Canadian self governance.

The wealthiest and most prominent Loyalist exiles went to Great Britain to rebuild their careers; many received pensions. Many Southern Loyalists, taking along their slaves, went to the West Indies, particularly to the Abaco Islands in the Bahamas.

Certain Loyalists who fled the United States brought their slaves with them to Canada (mostly to areas that later became Ontario and New Brunswick) where slavery was legal. An imperial law in 1790 assured prospective immigrants to Canada that their slaves would remain their property. However, a law enacted by eminent British lieutenant general and founder of modern Toronto John Graves Simcoe in 1793 entitled the Act Against Slavery tried to suppress slavery in Upper Canada by halting the sale of slaves to the United States, and by freeing slaves upon their escape from the latter into Canada. Simcoe desired to demonstrate the merits of loyalism and abolitionism in Upper Canada in contrast to the nascent republicanism and prominence of slavery in the United States, and, according to historian Stanley R. Mealing:
"...he had not only the most articulate faith in its imperial destiny but also the most sympathetic appreciation of the interests and aspirations of its inhabitants".

However the actual law was a compromise. According to historian Afua Cooper, Simcoe's law required children in slavery to be freed when they reached age 25 and:
forbade the importation of slaves but, to Simcoe's disappointment, did not grant freedom to adult slaves. Having not been freed by the act, many Canadian slaves fled across the border into the Old Northwest Territory, where slavery had been abolished.

Thousands of Iroquois and other Native Americans were expelled from New York and other states and resettled in Canada. The descendants of one such group of Iroquois, led by Joseph Brant (Thayendenegea), settled at Six Nations of the Grand River, the largest First Nations reserve in Canada. (The remainder, under the leadership of Cornplanter (John Abeel) and members of his family, stayed in New York.) A group of African-American Loyalists settled in Nova Scotia but emigrated again for Sierra Leone after facing discrimination there.

Many of the Loyalists were forced to abandon substantial properties to America restoration of or compensation for these lost properties was a major issue during the negotiation of the Jay Treaty in 1794. The British Government eventually settled several thousand claims for more than 3.5 million Pounds Sterling, an enormous sum of money worth at that time.

Return of some expatriates
The great majority of Loyalists never left the United States; they stayed on and were allowed to be citizens of the new country. Some became nationally prominent leaders, including Samuel Seabury, who was the first Bishop of the Episcopal Church, and Tench Coxe. There was a small, but significant trickle of returnees who found life in Nova Scotia and New Brunswick too difficult. Perhaps 10% of the refugees to New Brunswick returned to the States as did an unknown number from Nova Scotia. Some Massachusetts Tories settled in the Maine District. Nevertheless, the vast majority never returned. Captain Benjamin Hallowell, who as Mandamus Councilor in Massachusetts served as the direct representative of the Crown, was considered by the insurgents as one of the most hated men in the Colony, but as a token of compensation when he returned from England in 1796, his son was allowed to regain the family house.

Alexander Hamilton enlisted the help of the Tories (ex-Loyalists) in New York in 1782–85 to forge an alliance with moderate Whigs to wrest the State from the power of the Clinton faction. Moderate Whigs in other States who had not been in favor of separation from Britain but preferred a negotiated settlement which would have maintained ties to the Mother Country mobilized to block radicals. Most States had rescinded anti-Tory laws by 1787, although the accusation of being a Tory was heard for another generation. Several hundred who had left for Florida returned to Georgia in 1783–84. South Carolina which had seen a bitter bloody internal civil war in 1780-82 adopted a policy of reconciliation that proved more moderate than any other state. About 4500 white Loyalists left when the war ended, but the majority remained behind. The state government successfully and quickly reincorporated the vast majority. During the war, pardons were offered to Loyalists who switched sides and joined the Patriot forces. Others were required to pay a 10% fine of the value of the property. The legislature named 232 Loyalists liable for the confiscation of their property, but most appealed and were forgiven. In Connecticut much to the disgust of the Radical Whigs the moderate Whigs were advertising in New York newspapers in 1782-83 that Tories who would make no trouble would be welcome on the grounds that their skills and money would help the State's economy. The Moderates prevailed. All anti-Tory laws were repealed in early 1783 except for the law relating to confiscated Tory estates: "... the problem of the loyalists after 1783 was resolved in their favor after the War of Independence ended." In 1787 the last of any discriminatory laws were rescinded.

Effect of the departure of Loyalist leaders
The departure of so many royal officials, rich merchants and landed gentry destroyed the hierarchical networks that had dominated most of the colonies. A major result was that a Patriot/Whig elite supplanted royal officials and affluent Tories. In New York, the departure of key members of the De Lancey, De Peyster, Walton and Cruger families undercut the interlocking families that largely owned and controlled the Hudson Valley. Likewise in Pennsylvania, the departure of powerful families—Penn, Allen, Chew, Shippen—destroyed the cohesion of the old upper class there. Massachusetts passed an act banishing forty-six Boston merchants in 1778, including members of some of Boston's wealthiest families. The departure of families such as the Ervings, Winslows, Clarks, and Lloyds deprived Massachusetts of men who had hitherto been leaders of networks of family and clients. The bases of the men who replaced them were much different. One rich Patriot in Boston noted in 1779 that "fellows who would have cleaned my shoes five years ago, have amassed fortunes and are riding in chariots." New men became rich merchants but they shared a spirit of republican equality that replaced the former elitism.

The Patriot reliance on Catholic France for military, financial and diplomatic aid led to a sharp drop in anti-Catholic rhetoric. Indeed, the king replaced the pope as the demon Patriots had to fight against. Anti-Catholicism remained strong among Loyalists, some of whom went to Canada after the war most remained in the new nation. By the 1780s, Catholics were extended legal toleration in all of the New England states that previously had been so hostile. "In the midst of war and crisis, New Englanders gave up not only their allegiance to Britain but one of their most dearly held prejudices."

Loyalists in art
 John Singleton Copley painted many prominent Loyalists and produced an oil-on-canvas depiction of a soldier wearing the uniform of the Royal Ethiopian Regiment (a regiment composed of black Loyalist soldiers) in The Death of Major Pierson (1784).
 Benjamin West characterized the ethnic and economic diversity of the Loyalists in his Reception of the American Loyalists by Great Britain in the Year 1783. The original painting was lost, but a smaller version of it can be seen in the background of West's portrait of John Eardley Wilmot.
 Gilbert Stuart painted a portrait of James DeLancey around 1785. It stays in the collection of the Metropolitan Museum of Art, a bequest of his descendant George DeLancey Harris, Jr. of New York City & Annapolis Royal, NS.

Loyalists in literature

 The Adventures of Jonathan Corncob, Loyal American Refugee (1787) by Jonathan Corncob. According to Maya Jasanoff, "traveling to London to file a claim served as the opening gambit" for this "picaresque novel about the American Revolution".
 "Rip Van Winkle" (1819), short story by Washington Irving
 The Spy: a Tale of the Neutral Ground (1821), novel by James Fenimore Cooper
 Oliver Wiswell (1940), a novel by Kenneth Roberts
 The Book of Negroes (2007) by Lawrence Hill
 The Fort (2010), novel by Bernard Cornwell
  Well received historical fiction account of the life of Elizabeth Graeme Fergusson

List of notable Loyalists

See also

 Monarchism in the United States
 American Revolution - Nova Scotia theatre
 Expulsion of the Loyalists
 List of places named for Loyalists (American Revolution)
 Frederick Haldimand (1718–1791) while serving in Canada amassed a huge collection filling 115 microfilm reels of documents, letters, etc. reflecting the Loyalist experience in Canada. A partial finding aid to this collection may be found on the Queens University Archives website.
 Godfrey–Milliken Bill, proposed Canadian law demanding compensation from the US for Loyalist claims after its independence.
 Lorenzo Sabine (1803–1877), early historian and chronicler of the Loyalist experience
 Martin v. Hunter's Lessee
 Maryland Loyalists Battalion
 Tory
 Treaty of Paris (1783)
 United Empire Loyalist

References
Notes

Further reading
 Allen, Thomas B. Tories: Fighting for the King in America's First Civil War. New York: HarperCollins, 2010. 496 pp. 
 Andrews, Matthew Page, History of Maryland, Doubleday, New York (1929)
 Bailyn, Bernard. The Ideological Origins of the American Revolution (2nd ed. 1992) pp 230–319.
 ———. The Ordeal of Thomas Hutchinson: Loyalism and the Destruction of the First British Empire (1974), full scale biography of the most prominent Loyalist
  Brown, Wallace. "The Loyalists and the American Revolution." History Today (Mar 1962), 12# 3, pp149–157.
 Brown, Wallace. The King's Friends: The Composition and Motives of the American Loyalist Claimants (1966).
 Calhoon, Robert M. "Loyalism and neutrality" in Jack P. Greene and J.R. Pole, eds., The Blackwell Encyclopedia of the American Revolution (1991); reprinted in 
 Calhoon, Robert M. The Loyalists in Revolutionary America, 1760–1781 (1973), the most detailed scholarly study
 Calhoon, Robert M., Timothy M. Barnes and George A. Rawlyk, eds. Loyalists and Community in North America (1994).
 Chopra, Ruma. "Enduring Patterns of Loyalist Study: Definitions and Contours" History Compass (2013) 11#11 pp 983–993, DOI: 10.1111/hic3.12105
 Chopra, Ruma. Choosing Sides: Loyalists in Revolutionary America (2015)
 Doré, Gilbert. "Why The Loyalists Lost," Early America Review (Winter 2000) online
 Frazer, Gregg L. God Against the Revolution: The Loyalist Clergy's Case against the American Revolution Lawrence, KS: University Press of Kansas, 2018.
 Jasanoff, Maya. Liberty's Exiles: American Loyalists in the Revolutionary World (2011), a comprehensive treatment, winner of the 2011 National Book Critics Circle Award for Non-Fiction and 2012 George Washington Book Prize
 Jensen, Merrill. The New Nation: A History of the United States during the Confederation, 1781–1789 1950; detailed discussion of return of Loyalists, popular anger at their return; repeal of wartime laws against them
 Kermes, Stephanie. "'I Wish for Nothing More Ardent upon Earth, than to See My Friends and Country Again': The Return of Massachusetts Loyalists." Historical Journal of Massachusetts 2002 30(1): 30–49. 
 Kerber, Linda. Women of the Republic: Intellect and Ideology in Revolutionary America (1997)
 Knowles, Norman. Inventing the Loyalists: The Ontario Loyalist Tradition and the Creation of Usable Pasts (1997) explores the identities and loyalties of those who moved to Canada.
 Lambert, Robert Stansbury. South Carolina Loyalists in the American Revolution (2nd ed. Clemson University Digital Press, 2011). full text online free 273 pp
 Middlekauff, Robert. "The Glorious Cause: The American Revolution, 1763–1789." (2005 edition)
 Moore, Christopher. The Loyalist: Revolution Exile Settlement. Toronto: McClelland and Stewart (1994).
 Mason, Keith. "The American Loyalist Diaspora and the Reconfiguration of the British Atlantic World." In Empire and Nation: The American Revolution and the Atlantic World, ed. Eliga H. Gould and Peter S. Onuf (2005).
 Minty, Christopher F. Unfriendly to Liberty: Loyalist Networks and the Coming of the American Revolution in New York City. Ithaca: Cornell University Press, 2023.
 Nelson, William H. The American Tory (1961)
 Norton, Mary Beth. The British-Americans: The Loyalist Exiles in England, 1774–1789. Boston, MA: Little, Brown, 1972.
 ———. Liberty's Daughters: The Revolutionary Experience of American Women, 1750–1800 (1996)
 ———. "The Problem of the Loyalist—and the Problems of Loyalist Historians," Reviews in American History June 1974 v.2 #2 pp 226–231
 Peck, Epaphroditus; The Loyalists of Connecticut Yale University Press, (1934) online
 Potter, Janice. The Liberty We Seek: Loyalist Ideology in Colonial New York and Massachusetts (1983).
 Quarles, Benjamin; Black Mosaic: Essays in Afro-American History and Historiography University of Massachusetts Press. (1988)
 Ranlet, Philip. "How Many American Loyalists Left the United States?." Historian 76.2 (2014): 278–307; estimates that only 20,000 adult white Loyalists went to Canada.
 Ryerson, Egerton. The Loyalists of America and Their Times: From 1620 to 1816. 2 volumes. Second edition. 1880.
 Smith, Paul H. "The American Loyalists: Notes on Their Organization and Numerical Strength," William and Mary Quarterly 25 (1968): 259–77. in JSTOR
 Van Tyne, Claude Halstead. The Loyalists in the American Revolution (1902) online
 Wade, Mason. The French Canadians: 1760–1945 (1955) 2 vol.

Compiled volumes of biographical sketches
 Palmer, Gregory. Biographical Sketches of Loyalists of the American Revolution. Greenwood Publishing Group, Inc., 1983. 998 pp. 
 Sabine, Lorenzo. The American Loyalists, or Biographical Sketches of Adherents to the British Crown in The War of the Revolution; Alphabetically Arranged; with a Preliminary Historical Essay. Boston, MA: Charles C. Little and James Brown, 1847.  Google Books vi, 733 pp.
 ———. Biographical Sketches of Loyalists of the American Revolution, with an Historical Essay. 2 volumes. Boston, MA: Little, Brown and Company, 1864.  Google Books Volume 1—vi, 608 pp.  Google Books Volume 2—600 pp.

Studies of individual Loyalists
 
 Gainey, Joseph R. "Rev. Charles Woodmason (c. 1720–1789): Author, Loyalist, Missionary, and Psalmodist." West Gallery: The Newsletter of the West Gallery Music Association, Issue No. 59 (Autumn 2011), pp. 18–25. This undocumented article is the first publication to identify Woodmason's parents, background, baptism, marriage, and burial dates and places and contains much previously unavailable information.
 Hill, James Riley, III. An exercise in futility: the pre-Revolutionary career and influence of loyalist James Simpson. M. A. Thesis. University of South Carolina, Columbia, SC, 1992.  viii, 109 leaves ; 28 cm. OCLC 30807526
 Hooker, Richard J., ed. The Carolina Backcountry on the Eve of the Revolution: The Journal and Other Writings of Charles Woodmason, Anglican Itinerant. 1953. 
 Lohrenz, Otto; "The Advantage of Rank and Status: Thomas Price, a Loyalist Parson of Revolutionary Virginia." The Historian. 60#3 (1998) pp 561+. online
 Randall, Willard Sterne. A Little Revenge: Benjamin Franklin & His Son Little, Brown & Co, 1984.
 Skemp, Sheila. William Franklin: Son of a Patriot, Servant of a King Oxford University Press, 1990.
 Wright, J. Leitch. William Augusutus Bowles: Director General of the Creek Nation. Athens, GA: University of Georgia Press, 1967.
 Zimmer, Anne Y. Jonathan Boucher, loyalist in exile. Detroit, MI: Wayne State University Press, 1978.

Primary sources and guides to manuscripts and the literature
 Allen, Robert S. Loyalist Literature: An Annotated Bibliographic Guide to the Writings on the Loyalists of the American Revolution. Issue 2 of Dundurn Canadian historical document series, 1982. 
 Brown, Wallace. "Loyalist Historiography." Acadiensis, Vol. 4, No. 1 (Autumn 1974), pp. 133–138. Link to downloadable pdf of this article.
 ———. "The View at Two Hundred Years: The Loyalists of the American Revolution", Proceedings of the American Antiquarian Society, Vol. 80, Part 1 (April 1970), pp. 25–47.
 Crary, Catherine S., ed. Price of Loyalty: Tory Writings from the Revolutionary Era (1973)
 Egerton, Hugh Edward, ed. The Royal commission on the losses and services of American loyalists, 1783 to 1785, being the notes of Mr. Daniel Parker Coke, M. P., one of the commissioners during that period. Oxford: The Roxburghe Club, 1915. Link to downloadable pdf
 Galloway, Joseph. The claim of the American loyalists: reviewed and maintained upon incontrovertible principles of law and justice. G. and T. Wilkie, 1788. Downloadable  Google Books pdf 138 pages
 Guide to The Loyalist Collection website, Harriet Irving Library, Fredericton campus, University of New Brunswick, Canada
 Guide to the New York Public Library Loyalist Collection (19 pdfs)
 Palmer, Gregory S. A Bibliography of Loyalist Source Material in the United States, Canada, and Great Britain. Westport, CT, 1982.
 The Particular Case of the Georgia Loyalists: in Addition to the General Case and Claim of the American Loyalists, which was Lately Published by Order of Their Agents. February 1783. n.p.:n.p., 1783. 16 pp. Google Books pdf

External links
 American Loyalists
 The American Loyalists: Or, Biographical Sketches of Adherents to the ... (1847) by Lorenzo Sabine. Complete text of the first of two editions (the second appeared in 1864 in two volumes) of Sabine's magnum opus in pdf format.
 Benjamin Franklin to Baron Francis Maseres, June 26, 1785 (Opinion of Benjamin Franklin on persons who called themselves "Loyalists", whom he judged better called "Royalists")
 Bibliography of the Loyalist Participation in the American Revolution compiled by the United States Army Center of Military History
 "Black Loyalists: Our History, Our People"
 Haldimand Collection The main source for historians in the study of the settlement of the American Loyalists in Canada. More than 20,000 letters and documents, now fully indexed, and free on the Web.
 Story of Loyalist Privateer "Vengeance"
 James Chalmers and "Plain Truth" (A Loyalist Answers Thomas Paine)
 The Loyalist Declaration of Independence published in The Royal Gazette (New York) on November 17, 1781 (Transcription provided by Bruce Wallace and posted on The On-Line Institute for Advanced Loyalist Studies.)
 The Loyalist Link: The Forest and The Sea – Port Roseway Loyalists
 Loyalist Page – Cyndi's List
 The Loyalist Research Network (LRN)  This website focuses on Canadian Loyalists, but, the links and bibliographies are extremely helpful to all serious Loyalist researchers.
 Maryland
 The On-Line Institute for Advanced Loyalist Studies
 "Remembering Black Loyalists, Black Communities in Nova Scotia"
 "Salem Loyalists-unpublished letters" THE NEW-ENGLAND HISTORICAL AND GEUEALOGICAL REGISTER AND ANTIQUARIAN JOURNAL 1872 pp.243-248
  "A Short History of the United Empire Loyalists" Ann Mackenzie
 South Carolina
  Originally published in 1987. 272 pages, available online in PDF format.
 United Empire Loyalists' Association of Canada (UELAC)
 Virginia
 “What is a Loyalist? The American Revolution as civil war” by Prof. Edward Larkin published in www.common-place.org, Vol. 8, No. 1 (October 2007).
 Why Were Some of Our Ancestors Tories?

Videos
 
 
 
 

 
Conservatism in the United States
Toryism